The fifth edition of the Caribbean Series (Serie del Caribe) was played in 1953. It was held from February 20 through February 25, featuring the champion baseball teams of Cuba, Leones de la Habana; Panama, Chesterfield Smokers; Puerto Rico, Cangrejeros de Santurce, and Venezuela, Leones del Caracas. The format consisted of 12 games, each team facing the other teams twice. The games were played at Estadio del Cerro in Havana, the Cuban capital.

Summary
Puerto Rico finished undefeated and won the title by going 6-0, outscoring their opponents 50 to 23. The Santurce club, who hit a collective .367 batting average and committed only two errors, was led by right fielder and Series MVP Willard Brown, who enjoyed one of the most productive offensive in tournament's history. Brown led the hitters in home runs (4), RBI (13), runs (8), doubles (3) and SLG (1,042), while hitting .417 (10-for-24). The pitching staff was anchored by Bobo Holloman (2-0), Cot Deal (2-0, one save) and Rubén Gómez (1-0, one save). In addition to Brown, shortstop/manager Buster Clarkson (.467 BA), 2B Jim Gilliam (.545, two HR), RF Bob Thurman (.474, .684 SLG) and 3B Víctor Pellot Power (.385, one HR) also contributed to the attack.  Other players for Puerto Rico included CF Luis (Canena) Márquez, P José (Pantalones) Santiago and catchers Joe Montalvo and Valmy Thomas.

The Cuban team, who many considered a favorite before the start of the event, wasted home-field advantage and a solid lineup managed by Mike González to end in second place with a 3-3 record. The Habana team was led by RF Pedro Formental, who posted a .560 mark to clinch the batting title. Other contributions came from 1B Bert Haas (.360, two HR, .600 SLG) and 3B Lou Klein (.316, one HR, .579 SLG). Pitchers Bob Alexander and Mario Picone collected wins, while Carlos (Patato) Pascual  dropped two of three decisions. Cuba included LF Sandy Amorós, 2B Spider Jorgensen,  CF Bob Usher, P Adrián Zabala, and catchers Andrés Fleitas and Dick Rand, between others.

Panama was managed by Stanford Graham and finished 2-4 in third place. The Panamanian squad got fine work of CF Nat Peeples (.400, .733 SLG), as well as pitchers Humberto Robinson (1-0) and Pat Scantlebury (1-1, 11 strikeouts in three games). The team also featured players as IFs Frank Austin and Joe Tuminelli, C León Kellman, and OFs Bobby Prescott and Dave Roberts. Collectively, Chesterfield scored the fewest runs (18) and committed the most errors (10) in the Series.

Venezuela, with Martín Dihigo at the helm, finished in last place with a 1-5 record. The Caracas lone victory came from Charlie Bishop, who pitched a one-hit shutout in Game 5. Among others were Ps Jay Heard, Dick Starr, Lenny Yochim and Luis Zuloaga; C Guillermo Vento;  IFs Chico Carrasquel, Pompeyo Davalillo, Piper Davis and Hank Schenz, as well as OFs Dalmiro Finol, Lloyd Gearhart, Milt Nielsen and Gale Wade.

Final standings

Scoreboards

Game 1, February 20

Game 2, February 20

Game 3, February 21

Game 4, February 21

Game 5, February 22

Game 6, February 22

Game 7, February 23

Game 8, February 23

Game 9, February 24

Game 10, February 24

Game 11, February 25

Game 12, February 25

See also
Ballplayers who have played in the Series

Sources
Antero Núñez, José. Series del Caribe. Jefferson, Caracas, Venezuela: Impresos Urbina, C.A., 1987.
Gutiérrez, Daniel. Enciclopedia del Béisbol en Venezuela – 1895-2006 . Caracas, Venezuela: Impresión Arte, C.A., 2007.

External links
Official site
Latino Baseball
Series del Caribe, Las (Spanish)

  
  

Caribbean
Caribbean Series
International baseball competitions hosted by Cuba
Baseball competitions in Havana
1953 in Cuban sport
1953 in Caribbean sport
20th century in Havana
Caribbean Series